Angel Inn may refer to:

The Angel Inn, a public house in Andover, Hampshire
Angel and Royal, a hotel in Grantham, Lincolnshire
The Angel, Islington, formerly a public house and hotel in Islington, London